is a Japanese manga series written and illustrated by Yellow Tanabe. It was serialized for five chapters in Shogakukan's Weekly Shōnen Sunday manga magazine from November to December 2012. Shogakukan collected the chapters in a single tankōbon volume released in March 2013.

Publication
Laughter at the World's End, written and illustrated by Yellow Tanabe, ran for five chapters in Shogakukan's Weekly Shōnen Sunday, from November 21 to December 26, 2012. Shogakukan collected the chapters in a single tankōbon volume, published on March 18, 2013.

The manga has been licensed in Southeast Asia by Shogakukan Asia, in France by Shiba Édition and in Spain by Milky Way Ediciones.

Chapter list

References

External links

Dark fantasy anime and manga
Shogakukan manga
Shōnen manga